Anthony Derek Thomas Scully (born 12 June 1976 in Dublin) is an Irish former professional footballer and coach who started his career with Crystal Palace.

Career
While at Palace Scully went on loan to AFC Bournemouth and Cardiff City before joining Manchester City in 1997. He was loaned out to league rivals Stoke City in 1998 where he played seven games for The Potters before he returned to Manchester City. He left for Queens Park Rangers in March 1998 for a fee of £155,000. He spent three years at Loftus Road, and joined Cambridge United after. Scully then went on to spend short periods of time at Dagenham & Redbridge (where he scored twice in the Football League Trophy against Leyton Orient and former club QPR), Barnet, Tamworth (where he scored on his only appearance for the club against Leigh RMI), Notts County and Exeter before finishing his career at Crawley Town due to a persistent knee injury.

Career statistics
Source:

References

External links

1976 births
Living people
Republic of Ireland association footballers
Republic of Ireland under-21 international footballers
Association footballers from Dublin (city)
Crystal Palace F.C. players
AFC Bournemouth players
Cardiff City F.C. players
Manchester City F.C. players
Queens Park Rangers F.C. players
Stoke City F.C. players
Cambridge United F.C. players
Southend United F.C. players
Peterborough United F.C. players
Dagenham & Redbridge F.C. players
Barnet F.C. players
Notts County F.C. players
Exeter City F.C. players
Tamworth F.C. players
Crawley Town F.C. players
English Football League players
National League (English football) players
Cherry Orchard F.C. players
Association football wingers
Irish expatriate sportspeople in England
Irish expatriate sportspeople in Wales